Stade Lavallois Mayenne Football Club, also referred to as Stade Laval or simply Laval, is a French association football club. It was based in Laval in western France. The club was formed on 17 July 1902 and currently plays in Ligue 2, the second level of French football. Laval plays its home matches at the Stade Francis Le Basser located in the city.

History
The club was founded in 1902 by Joseph Gemain, a passionate supporter of the sport of football. Émile Sinoir was installed as the club's first president. At that time, players were supplied with red tops and black shorts and matches were played at Senelle, a district of Laval. Laval's first official match was against nearby Rennes. In 1903, the club participated in the Breton championship for the first time, and the red and black strip was changed for a green and white combination. In 1918, the kit colour was changed again, to a bright orange strip. In 1930, the club began playing at the Stade Jean Yvinec, named in honour of a former player who died at the age of 26. By 1931, Laval had risen to the Division d'Honneur, the sixth level of French football. The club continued to rotate between the amateur leagues before finally winning the Division d'Honneur in 1964, which propelled the club to the Championnat de France amateur, France's highest division of amateur football.

The following season, Laval surprisingly won the league in its debut season. With the club heightening its ambitions, new aspirations came about and Laval named former club player and Breton Michel Le Milinaire manager. The president was Henri Bisson. Together, the two made Laval into one of the best clubs in France. In 1976, Laval reached the top division of French football, thus becoming a professional team for the first time in the club's history. Despite being classed as outsiders, the club managed to stay in the top-flight division, even qualifying for the UEFA Cup in 1983 after finishing a commendable fifth in the league. In Laval's first season in Europe, it knocked Dynamo Kyiv out of the competition, before being knocked out by Austria Wien. This would prove to be the club's only European experience. In 1989, the club was relegated to the second division, after 13 years in the elite division. In 2005, Laval became a SASP (Société Anonyme Sportive Professionnelle), roughly equivalent to going on the stock exchange. In the 2005–06 season, the club was relegated to the Championnat National. Laval remained in the third division for two seasons before managing promotion back to Ligue 2 after the 2008–09 season.

In the 2021–22 season, Laval achieved promotion to Ligue 2 by winning the Championnat National.

Honours
Championnat National:
Champions (1): 2021–22
Division d'Honneur (West):
Champions (1): 1963–64
Coupe Gambardella: 
Champions (1): 1983–84

Current squad

Notable players
Below are the notable former players who have represented Laval in league and international competition since the club's foundation in 1902.

For a complete list of Stade Laval players, see :Category:Stade Lavallois players.

 Raymond Keruzoré
 Claude Le Roy
 Jean-Marc Furlan
 Erwin Kostedde
 Uwe Krause
 Jean-Pierre Tempet
 Patrick Delamontagne
 Jean-Luc Dogon
 Pierre Aubameyang
 Frank Leboeuf
 Mickaël Madar
 François Omam-Biyik
 Ousmane Dabo
 Patrice Carteron
 Eugène Dadi
 Lionel Pérez
 Jérôme Leroy
 Lilian Nalis
 Franck Haise
 Djimi Traoré
 Régis Le Bris
 Pierre-Emerick Aubameyang
 François Zoko
 Mehdi Lacen
 Hassan Yebda
 Fahid Ben Khalfallah
 Francis Coquelin
 Romain Hamouma
 Anthony Losilla
 Nicolas Pallois
 Christian Bekamenga
 Serhou Guirassy
 Hugo Boumous
 Wesley Saïd
 Nordi Mukiele
 Yvan Neyou
 Yoane Wissa
 Oumar Solet
 Mehdi Boudjemaa

Coaching staff

Managers

References

 
Association football clubs established in 1902
1902 establishments in France
Sport in Mayenne
Laval
Ligue 1 clubs